James Noel Carroll Alder MBE (born 10 June 1940) is a British former distance runner, from Morpeth.

Alder, who was born in Glasgow, was a foster child. His mother died of tuberculosis and his father was killed on the last day of World War II. He moved to Morpeth, north of Newcastle, and became interested in running.

Athletics career
Alder's athletic career saw him compete at the 1966 Commonwealth Games in Kingston winning Marathon Gold, (having missed the 1964 Summer Olympics due to a knee injury). He competed in the 1968 Summer Olympics in Mexico City, the 1969 European Athletics Championships in Athens and the 1970 Commonwealth Games in Edinburgh.

He set a new world record for 30,000 m of 1 h 34 min 01.8 s in 1964. In that race he also set world records for 20 miles (1 h 40 min 58.0 s) and 2 hours (37,994m). The IAAF did not recognise the latter two marks for world records, but they were accepted as United Kingdom national records.

At the 1968 Olympic Games, in Mexico City, his height was recorded at 5 ft 8 in (172 cm) and his weight was 141 lb (64 kg).

Alder ran his last marathon in the 1970 Commonwealth Games in Edinburgh. In September 1970, in London, he set a new record for 30,000 m of 1 h 31 min 30.4 s which still stands today.

He won The Great Northern Half Marathon, Belfast in 1971 promoted by County Antrim Harriers in a time of 1:05:05.(Athletics Weekly 22 May 1971)

He was featured in The Sunday Times, on 15 April 2007, which profiled his gold medal-winning run in the 1966 Commonwealth Games in Kingston, Jamaica. Later that year in October, Alder featured on the BBC One series Inside Sport and was interviewed by Ray Stubbs. In 2012, Alder was selected to carry the Olympic flame through Northumberland, for the 2012 Olympic Games in London.

References

External links
 

1940 births
Living people
Sportspeople from Glasgow
People from Morpeth, Northumberland
Sportspeople from Northumberland
Scottish male long-distance runners
Scottish male marathon runners
Olympic athletes of Great Britain
Athletes (track and field) at the 1968 Summer Olympics
Commonwealth Games gold medallists for Scotland
Commonwealth Games silver medallists for Scotland
Commonwealth Games bronze medallists for Scotland
Commonwealth Games medallists in athletics
Athletes (track and field) at the 1966 British Empire and Commonwealth Games
Athletes (track and field) at the 1970 British Commonwealth Games
European Athletics Championships medalists
Members of the Order of the British Empire
Medallists at the 1966 British Empire and Commonwealth Games
Medallists at the 1970 British Commonwealth Games